The Journal of Operational Risk is a bimonthly peer-reviewed academic journal covering the measurement and management of operational risk. It was established in 2006 and is published by Incisive Risk Information. The editor-in-chief is Marcelo Cruz (Morgan Stanley). According to the Journal Citation Reports, the journal has a 2015 impact factor of 0.576.

References

External links 
 

Finance journals
Publications established in 2006
Bimonthly journals
English-language journals
Operational risk